The 2020 Nevada wildfire season began in June 2020. The season is a part of the 2020 Western United States wildfire season.

List of wildfires

References

 
Wildfires
Wildfires in Nevada